Gręzówka  is a village in the administrative district of Gmina Łuków within Łuków County, Lublin Voivodeship in eastern Poland.

References

Villages in Łuków County